The Sechura lizardfish (Synodus sechurae) is a species of lizardfish that lives mainly in the eastern Pacific Ocean.

Information
The Sechura lizardfish are known to be found in a marine environment and within a demersal depth range of about 45 – 60 meters. This species is native to a marine environment. The maximum recorded length of the Sechura lizardfish is about 30 centimeters or about 11.8 inches. This species is considered to be an uncommon species. This species is not used for commercial use for aquarium use, and it is not recommended.

Common names
The common names of the Sechura lizardfish in different languages include the following:
French : Anoli iguane 
Spanish : chile iguana
Spanish : Huavina 
English : iguana lizardfish
Spanish : Lagarto iguana 
English : Lizardfish 
Spanish : Pez lagartija 
English : Sechura lizardfish 
Mandarin Chinese : 塞氏狗母魚 
Mandarin Chinese : 塞氏狗母鱼

Countries
The distribution of the Sechura lizardfish includes the following countries:
Colombia
Costa Rica
Ecuador
El Salvador
Guatemala 
Honduras
Mexico
Nicaragua
Panama
Peru

Classification
The taxonomic classification of the Sechura lizardfish is as follows:
Kingdom : Animalia	
Phylum : Chordata	
Class : Actinoptergii	
Order : Aulopiformes
Family : Synodontidae

References

Notes
 

Synodontidae
Fish described in 1946